The Doom of Devorgoil is a play by Sir Walter Scott, initially written in 1817 and 1818, and then reworked in 1829 and 1830 for publication in the spring of 1830, together with another work titled Auchindrane in an octavo volume. The play was one of Scott's few critical failures.

History
On April 26, 1829, after Scott had spent several days working on Anne of Geierstein, he sought to distract himself with something else. According to Scott's account:

The play was written "for the purpose of obliging the late Mr. Terry, then Manager of the Adelphi Theatre, for whom the Author had a particular regard". However, it was not performed, because "[t]he manner in which the mimic goblins of Devorgoil are intermixed with the supernatural machinery, was found to be objectionable, and the production had other faults, which rendered it unfit for representation".

In April 1830, Scott further wrote of the play:

Plot
The Edinburgh Literary Journal, in its review of the play, summarized the plot as follows:

Reception
The play was poorly received, with the Edinburgh Literary Journal suggesting that Scott should have thrown both Doom of Devorgoil and Auchindrane into the fire rather than publishing them. The Journal reported that for both plays the plot was "exceedingly bare and meagre", and that Doom of Devorgoil was "in particular wofully deficient in interest", with a catastrophic event central to the plot "clumsily and abruptly brought about". The Journal further stated that "[n]one of the characters are well, or fully, drawn. The three females are positively disagreeable, for they are made to talk in a petulant and unbecoming manner, quite foreign to the gentleness usually belonging to their sex, and consequently effectually checking our interest in them".

References

Works by Walter Scott
1830 plays